
This is a list of African American Historic Places in Georgia.  This was originally based on a book by the National Park Service, The Preservation Press, the National Trust for Historic Preservation, and the National Conference of State Historic Preservation Officers, which may primarily have addressed sites that were listed, or were eligible for listing, on the National Register of Historic Places (NRHP).  Historic sites might meet local or state criteria for listing in a historic register with or without meeting NRHP listing criteria.

A volunteer organization, the Georgia African American Historic Preservation Network (GAAHPN), has been active in preserving African American historic resources since 1989.

The state of Georgia's Historic Preservation Division has staff dedicated in this area since 2000.  The program assists in preservation and, with GAAHPN, publishes Reflections, a periodical featuring African American historic sites and stories.  HPD's program was the first established within any state historic preservation office.

Some of these sites are on the National Register of Historic Places (NR) as independent sites or as part of larger historic district. Several of the sites are National Historic Landmarks (NRL). Others have Georgia historical markers (HM). The citation on historical markers is given in the reference. The location listed is the nearest community to the site. More precise locations are given in the reference.

Baldwin County
 Milledge
 Westover

Bartow County
 Cassville
 Noble Hill School, a Rosenwald School

Bibb County

 Macon
Douglass Theatre, in NRHP-listed Macon Historic District, founded in 1921 by Charles H. Douglass, an African American entrepreneur, to address absence of theatres accessible to African Americans Jim Crow era.
Fort Hill Historic District
Pleasant Hill Historic District
Bowden Golf Course

Burke County
 Keysville
 Hopeful Baptist Church

Camden County
 St. Marys
 High Point-Half Moon Bluff Historic District

Chatham County

 Burroughs
 St. Bartholomew's Church
Nicholsonville
 Nicholsonville Baptist Church
 Savannah
 Laurel Grove-South Cemetery

Clarke County

 Athens
Chestnut Grove School
Morton Building
Reese Street Historic District

Cobb County
 Marietta
 Zion Baptist Church

Dougherty County
 Albany
 Bridge House

Effingham County
 Guyton
 New Hope AME Church

Elbert County
 Elberton
 Dove Creek Baptist Church

Floyd County
 Cave Spring
 Chubb Methodist Episcopal Church

Fulton County

Atlanta
Atlanta University Center District
Butler Street Colored Methodist Episcopal Church
First Congregational Church
Martin Luther King Jr. National Historical Park
Odd Fellows Building and Auditorium
Stone Hall, Atlanta University
Sweet Auburn Historic District
Booker T. Washington High School
Younge Street School

Glynn County
 St. Simons Island
 Hamilton Plantation Slave Cabins

Greene County
 Greensboro
 Dr. Calvin M. Baber House
South Street-Broad Street-Main Street-Laurel Street Historic District
Springfield Baptist Church

Habersham County
 Clakesville
 Daes Chapel Methodist Church

Hancock County
 Mayfield
 Camilla-Zack Community Center District

Hart County
 Hartwell
 H.E. Fortson House
Jackson Morrison House
John Underwood House

Jefferson County
 Louisville
 Old Market

Liberty County

 Midway
 Dorchester Academy Boys' Dormitory

Lowndes County
 Valdosta
 Dasher High School

Meriwether County
 Greenville
 Greenville Historic District
Woodbury
Red Oak Creek Covered Bridge

Morgan County
 Madison
 Madison Historic District (Boundary Increase)

Muscogee County
 Columbus
Building at 1612 3rd Avenue
Claflin School
Colored Cemetery
First African Baptist Church
Girard Colored Misson
Liberty Theater
Isaac Maund House
William Price House
Gertrude Pridgett "Ma" Rainey House
William Henry Spencer House
St. Christopher's Normal and Industrial Parish School
John Stewart House
St. John Chapel

Paulding County
Hiram Colored School, a Rosenwald School that was NRHP-listed in 2001.

Randolph County
 Cuthbert
 Fletcher Henderson House

Richmond County
 Augusta
Laney-Walker North Historic District
Springfield Baptist Church (Boundary Increase)

Thomas County

 Thomasville
Bethany Congregational Church
Church of the Good Shepherd

Washington County
 Sanderville
Thomas Jefferson Elder High and Industrial School, the first Rosenwald School in Georgia to be listed on the National Register (in 1981)

References

 
Georgia (U.S. state)-related lists
Georgia
Historic sites in Georgia (U.S. state)